Peillon is a rural commune in the Alpes-Maritimes department in the southeastern Provence-Alpes-Côte d'Azur region in France. In 2019, it had a population of 1,465.

Geography
The commune, perched on a mountaintop, is known to have stairs instead of roads.

Demographics
In French, the inhabitants are called Peillonnais (masculine) and Peillonnaises (feminine).

See also
Communes of the Alpes-Maritimes department

References

Communes of Alpes-Maritimes
Alpes-Maritimes communes articles needing translation from French Wikipedia